Examining Board v. Flores de Otero, 426 U.S. 572 (1976), was a case decided by the Supreme Court of the United States that invalidated a state law that excluded aliens from the practice of civil engineering. The Court invalidated the law on the basis of equal protection using a strict scrutiny standard of review.

Prior history
A Puerto Rico law permits only United States citizens to practice privately as civil engineers. Appellees are alien civil engineers residing in Puerto Rico, one of whom (Flores de Otero) was denied a license under this law, and the other of whom (Perez Nogueiro) was granted only a conditional license to work for the Commonwealth.  Each appellee brought suit for declaratory and injunctive relief against appellant Examining Board and its members in the United States District Court for the District of Puerto Rico, claiming jurisdiction under 28 U.S.C. § 1343(3) and alleging that the statute's citizenship requirement violated 42 U.S.C. § 1983.

See also
List of United States Supreme Court cases, volume 426

References

External links
 

United States equal protection case law
United States Supreme Court cases
1976 in United States case law
Legal history of Puerto Rico
Civil engineering
United States Supreme Court cases of the Burger Court